Utkal Gourav Madhusudan Institute of Technology, Rayagada or "UGMIT" is a state government polytechnic diploma engineering institution for boys and girls located at Rayagada, Odisha, India.

History
The Institute was established in the year of 1979 with a single 3 year Diploma course in Leather Technology with intake capacity of 15 students. It is affiliated to All India Council of Technical Education, New Delhi and State Council for Technical Education & Vocational Training recognized under state government of Odisha. Since last two years semester pattern has been introduced with internal examination for 30 marks and main examination for 70 marks.

Courses offered 
Presently the institute offers courses under Civil, Electrical, Mechanical as well as Electronics and Telecommunication engineering. The admission to Leather Technology has been kept in abeyance since 1991. Two hostels for boys are available which can accommodate about 100 students.

References

External links
official website of UGMIT, Rayagada

State Council for Technical Education & Vocational Training
All India Council for Technical Education
Engineering colleges in Odisha
Education in Rayagada district
Educational institutions established in 1979
1979 establishments in Orissa